Hopin is a proprietary video teleconferencing online conference-hosting platform. As of September 2021, the company is valued about $7.95 billion. It is a fully-remote company without having any office address. 

The platform allows meeting participants for conference attending and networking online, exchange virtual business cards, and get a summary of their connections after an event. Hopin enables organizers to create engaging and interactive virtual experiences for their attendees, and has become increasingly popular in the wake of the COVID-19 pandemic. 

Since 2020, the platform claims to have hosted more than 80 thousand events, working with organisations and companies like the United Nations, NATO and Unilever. It also claims to have more than 100,000 customers, including: Poshmark, American Express, The Financial Times, etc. Company does not disclose price-range publicly for its advanced plans.

Hopin acquired several early startups and companies in web video business including the most prominent Streamyard.

Hopin has raised a significant amount of funding in recent years from various investors, including Accel, IVP, Coatue Management, Northzone, Salesforce Ventures, and others.

See also
 Impact of the COVID-19 pandemic on science and technology
 List of video telecommunication services and product brands

References

2019 software
Impact of the COVID-19 pandemic on science and technology
Internet properties established in 2019
Software associated with the COVID-19 pandemic
Videotelephony
Web conferencing